Larry Jeffery "Mutt" Black (July 20, 1951 – February 8, 2006) was an American sprinter, winner of the gold medal in the 4 × 100 m relay and silver medal in the 200 m at the 1972 Summer Olympics in Munich.

Black was born in Miami, Florida, and graduated from Miami Killian Senior High with a scholarship to North Carolina Central University. Larry's coach at Miami Killian was Leroy Daniels. While studying there he won the NCAA  championships in 1971. At the 1972 Olympics, Black ran the opening leg in the American 4 × 100 m relay team. The team won a gold medal and equalled the United States' own world record of 38.19 seconds. His cousin Gerald Tinker, also from the Miami area (rival Coral Gables High School), ran the third leg in that same gold medal winning race.

After retiring from sport Black returned to Miami and became director of its parks and recreation department. He died from an aneurysm in Miami on February 8, 2006, at the age of 54.

References

1951 births
2006 deaths
Track and field athletes from Miami
American male sprinters
African-American male track and field athletes
North Carolina Central University alumni
Athletes (track and field) at the 1972 Summer Olympics
Olympic gold medalists for the United States in track and field
Olympic silver medalists for the United States in track and field
Medalists at the 1972 Summer Olympics
Deaths from aneurysm
20th-century African-American sportspeople
21st-century African-American people